Skoeda is a genus of ground beetles in the family Carabidae. There are about 11 described species in Skoeda, all found in Nepal.

Species
These 11 species belong to the genus Skoeda:
 Skoeda deliae Morvan, 1995
 Skoeda digammus Morvan, 1995
 Skoeda divleo Morvan, 1995
 Skoeda heinigeri Morvan, 1995
 Skoeda holzschuhi Morvan, 1995
 Skoeda kornreizus Morvan, 1995
 Skoeda moanus Morvan, 1995
 Skoeda montis (Jedlicka, 1965)
 Skoeda mus (Jedlicka, 1965)
 Skoeda naviauxi Morvan, 1995
 Skoeda shimomurai Morvan, 1995

References

Platyninae